Holy Trinity Church (Heilige Dreieinigkeit) was the first German-speaking Roman Catholic church in Cincinnati, Ohio. It was located at West Fifth Street and Mound Street in Cincinnati's historic West End. The parish was founded in 1834 and the church was dedicated on October 5, 1834.

Holy Trinity was founded to serve the growing tide of German-speaking Catholic population in Cincinnati. It was the mother church of the many German Catholic Churches in Cincinnati. In 1840, 30% of the population was German-speaking, necessitating the publication of ordinances in both German and English. Of the city's 12,000 Catholics, 8,000 were German.

Some of the Cincinnati German parishes were: Old St. Mary's Church (1840), St. John the Baptist Church (1844), St. Philomena (1846), St. Paul Church (Over the Rhine) (1847), St. Michael the Archangel Church (1847), St. Augustine (1852), Immaculata Church (1859), and St. Anthony (1860) and St. Stephen (1867).

Records for this Parish are located at: Chancery Office of the Archdiocese, 100 East Eighth Street, Cincinnati, Ohio 45202

This was the second parish founded in Cincinnati and was closed in 1958. The building was torn down for urban renewal and the construction of Interstate 75. Lost with this church were the Frank Duveneck murals, which were painted on each side of the main altar.

References

External links
Holy Trinity Church, from the Souvenir Album of American cities: Catholic Churches of Cincinnati and Hamilton County edition, 1896
Holy Trinity Church, Interior
Rev. John C. Albrinck, Ph.D., Vicar-General, Rector, Holy Trinity Church
Rev. Francis Roth, Assistant Rector, Holy Trinity Church, circa 1896

Former Roman Catholic church buildings in Ohio
Roman Catholic churches in Cincinnati
German-American history
German-American culture in Cincinnati
Demolished churches in Ohio
Buildings and structures demolished in 1958
West End, Cincinnati